A trucker hat, mesh cap or netback cap is a type of baseball cap. It is also sometimes known as a "gimme [as in 'give me'] cap" or a "feed cap" because this style of hat originated during the 1970s as a promotional give-away from U.S. feed or farming supply companies to farmers, truck drivers, or other rural workers.

Description

From the 1930s until the 1960s, truckers were provided with a type of peaked cap known as a mechanic's cap. This often bore the logo of the haulage company, and was later adopted by the 1950s greaser subculture. By the early 1970s, this cap had been replaced with the modern five piece mesh trucker hats, which were given away at truck stops by companies like Mountain Dew, Dekalb, Budweiser, Shell oil, or John Deere to advertise their products.

The design of a trucker cap is similar to that of a baseball cap, with a slightly curved bill in front, a cap constructed from six almost triangular gores, and a button on top. Instead of being made of cotton fabric like a typical baseball cap, the front section of a trucker hat above the bill is foam, and the rest is plastic mesh for breathability.  The foam front of the hat stands up straight and stiff, which makes the trucker hat taller than most baseball caps.  There is an adjustable plastic snap or hook-and-loop closure in the back to ensure that one size fits most.  This design was intended to make the cap much cooler in the sun or hot weather for the comfort of the wearer.

The original feed caps bore company logos on the front foam section of the cap, either printed or as a patch sewn on. These companies typically had a rural clientele, such as the local feed store or John Deere tractors.  Trucker-style hats can now be found with other pictures, logos, flags, camouflage, or humorous sayings on the front.  Trucker hats are still available as promotional items.

21st century trend
In the early 2000s, the trucker hat became a mainstream fashion trend, predominantly among suburban American youth associated with the hip-hop, pop punk and skater subcultures. This came about with a sense of irony due to the hat's rural or blue collar association and typically older demographic. It has frequently been donned by celebrities; musician Pharrell Williams and actor Ashton Kutcher in particular helped make the hat fashionable. However, in a 2008 interview with Fashion Rocks magazine, singer Justin Timberlake claimed that, while Kutcher has been cited for popularizing the trucker hat, Timberlake had been wearing them since the age of seventeen. The trucker hat trend was lampooned in the King of the Hill episode "Grand Theft Arlen", in which teenagers confuse Hank Hill by asking where he bought his Strickland Propane cap and questioning its irony.

Comedian Judah Friedlander is known for his signature trucker hats, which bear various humorous phrases. Having worn trucker hats since the 1980s, Friedlander claims a fondness for them and has ignored any rejecting or embracing fashion trends surrounding the hats throughout the decades. In a 2007 interview, he stated:
I was never into anything trendy. If I'm ever doing something that happens to be trendy, it's probably a coincidence and I don't even realize it's trendy. Just a note: I've been making and wearing trucker hats for years—since the '80s actually, when those were pretty much the only kind of hats you could get. I remember about 10 years ago, people used to make fun of me for wearing trucker style hats. And then when they became trendy a couple years ago, those same people came up to me and said shyly, 'Uhm, where do you get your hats? I need to get some.' Years ago, some people used to get angry with me for wearing them and someone even called me racist for wearing a trucker hat 'cause I looked like a redneck. I bet now, some people think I'm a loser for wearing them because now they're out of fashion. But you know what, I never wore 'em to be 'in' or trendy or cool. I just like 'em. And I'll be wearing them long after they're a not a trend.

In recent times, many outlaw country, punk, metal, blues and rock musicians have worn trucker hats on stage and in photographs. This includes Scott H. Biram, Bob Wayne of the Outlaw Carnies, Hank Williams III, Gary Lindsey of Assjack and Black Eyed Vermillion, Zach Shedd of Assjack and Hank III's Damn Band, Shawn "McNasty" McWilliams also of the Damn Band, Patrick Stump of Fall Out Boy, Dave "Shep" Shepherd & "Dixie" Dave Collins of Weedeater, and many others.

Trucker hats are also worn by Early Cuyler from Squidbillies, who wears a different hat in each episode (and sometimes multiple hats within a single episode).

See also
Workwear
Baseball cap
Patrol cap
2000s in American fashion

References

Caps
2000s fashion
1980s fashion
Workwear
Hipster (contemporary subculture)
Working-class culture